Lichen Lake may refer to:

 Lichen Lake (Opawica River), Quebec, Canada
 Lichen Lake (Minnesota), United States

See also
 Lichen (disambiguation)